
Lago Coipasa or Salar de Coipasa is a lake in Sabaya Province, Oruro Department, Bolivia. At an elevation of 3657 m, its surface area is 806 km². It is on the western part of Altiplano, 20 km north of Salar de Uyuni and south of the main road linking Oruro and Huara (Chile).

Lake Coipasa is a tectonic saline lake with a depth of 3.5 metres that is surrounded by the Coipasa salt flat (Salar de Coipasa), and the volcanic cone of Wila Pukarani.

Thousands of flamingos have settled on the shores of Lake Coipasa.

Gallery

See also 
 Chipaya
 Ouki

References

External links

Lakes of Oruro Department
Salt flats of Bolivia
Saline lakes of South America
Endorheic lakes of South America
Landforms of Oruro Department